"I've Got a Lovely Bunch of Coconuts" is a novelty song composed in 1944 (as "I've Got a Lovely Bunch of Cocoanuts") by Fred Heatherton, a songwriting pseudonym for a collaboration of English songwriters Harold Elton Box (1903–1981) and Desmond Cox (1903–1966), with Lewis Ilda (itself a pseudonym of American songwriter Irwin Dash, 1892–1984). The song was published by Box and Cox Publications (ASCAP).

The song celebrates the coconut shy (coconut toss) at funfairs, and the chorus of "Roll-a-bowl-a-ball-a-penny-a-pitch!" is based on the call of the showman "standing underneath the flare" (of gaslight), inviting the public to play.  The ball is tossed or bowled (as in cricket) or pitched at the coconuts with the object of knocking one off its stand.

Recording history
In 1950, the song was a top-ten hit in the United States for Freddy Martin And His Orchestra with vocalist Merv Griffin and sold over three million copies. The following year, it was a number-25 hit for Danny Kaye.

It was a staple song of the Billy Cotton Band Show on British radio and television. The song is still played over the public address at Cambridge United football matches after home wins.

The song appeared in I Could Go On Singing (1963), Judy Garland's last film. A portion of the song appeared in Disney's 1994 The Lion King (sung by the character Zazu, voiced by Rowan Atkinson). Nicolas Cage sang part of this song in National Treasure: Book of Secrets.  Ringo Starr sang an impromptu version of the song in Magical Mystery Tour, The Beatles' TV special broadcast by the BBC on 26 December 1967.  Actors Hayden Rorke and Bill Daily performed a few lines of the song on ukulele in the 1969 I Dream of Jeannie episode "Uncles a Go-Go". In the first episode of the 1977 sitcom Mind Your Language it is mentioned that a professor went crazy and sang this song.

Swedish performer Povel Ramel wrote a Swedish version of the song in 1950. This version, "Far jag kan inte få upp min kokosnöt" ("Dad I can't crack my coconut open"), has little to do with the original. It is sung by a little boy who, in the course of his attempts to open his resilient coconut, demolishes the family's furniture, disfigures his mother, and finally blows their house up. This version also features prominently in the film My Life as a Dog (1985), as well as in the Swedish language version of The Lion King.

In 1980, the Muppet Show produced a slight variation of the song for their fourth episode of the show's fifth season.

The song was parodied as "I've Got A Liver The Size of Coconuts" on the animated series The Critic.  The parody is sung by an inebriated Dudley Moore (impersonated voice by Maurice LaMarche) by his Arthur (1981 film) character.

The 2011 British 3D computer-animated family film Gnomeo & Juliet also includes a portion of the song.

References

External links
 
 Lyrics at traditionalmusic.co.uk

1944 songs
Novelty songs
Coconuts